Francis Josias, Duke of Saxe-Coburg-Saalfeld (25 September 1697, in Saalfeld – 16 September 1764, in Rodach) was a duke of Saxe-Coburg-Saalfeld.

Biography
He was the fourth living son of Johann Ernest IV, Duke of Saxe-Coburg-Saalfeld, the third born by his father's second wife Charlotte Johanna of Waldeck-Wildungen.

During his youth, Francis Josias served in the Imperial Army.

The death of his two older brothers Wilhelm Frederick (d. 28 July 1720) and Charles Ernest (d. 30 December 1720) made him the second in line in the succession of the duchy of Saxe-Coburg-Saalfeld, preceded only by his older half-brother, Christian Ernest.

When Christian Ernest married unequally in 1724, Francis Josias claimed the sole inheritance of the duchy. His father's will (1729), however, compelled him to rule jointly with his brother. In 1735, the support of the line of Saxe-Meiningen allowed him to effectively rule over Coburg on his own right, and Christian Ernest's death in 1745 made him the sole Duke. Already in 1733 he proclaimed primogeniture in the duchy, which, however, was confirmed by the Emperor only in 1747. From 1750 to 1755, he was regent of the duchy of Saxe-Weimar on behalf of Ernest Augustus II Konstantin.

Issue
In Rudolstadt on 2 January 1723 Franz Josias married Princess Anna Sophie of Schwarzburg-Rudolstadt. They had eight children:
Ernest Frederick (b. Saalfeld, 8 March 1724 – d. Coburg, 8 September 1800)
Johann Wilhelm (b. Coburg, 11 May 1726 – killed in battle, Hohenfriedberg, 4 June 1745)
Anna Sophie (b. Coburg, 3 September 1727 – d. Coburg, 10 November 1728)
Christian Franz (b. Coburg, 25 January 1730 – d. Coburg, 18 September 1797)
Charlotte Sophie (b. Coburg, 24 September 1731 – d. Schwerin, 2 August 1810), married on 13 May 1755 to Ludwig of Mecklenburg-Schwerin
Fredericka Magdalene (b. Coburg, 21 August 1733 – d. Coburg, 29 March 1734)
Frederica Caroline (b. Coburg, 24 June 1735 – d. Schloß Schwaningen, 18 February 1791), married on 22 November 1754 to Karl Alexander, Margrave of Brandenburg-Ansbach
Frederick Josias (b. Ehrenburg Palace, Coburg, 26 December 1737 – d. Coburg, 26 February 1815)

Ancestry

References 
 August Beck: Franz Josias, Herzog von Sachsen-Koburg-Saalfeld. En: Allgemeine Deutsche Biographie (ADB). Band 7, Duncker & Humblot, Leipzig 1877, S. 296.
 Das herzogliche Haus Sachsen-Coburg-Gotha. Seine Geschichte und gegenwärtige Stellung in Europa. C. Macklot, 1842, S. 234 ff. (Digitalisat)

External links

 WW-Person: A database of the higher nobility in Europe.

Dukes of Saxe-Coburg-Saalfeld
1697 births
1764 deaths